Christian Olsson (born 25 January 1980) is a former Swedish athlete competing in high jump and triple jump. He won an Olympic gold medal, one gold and one silver medal in the World Championships and two gold medals in the European Championships as well as a further two golds in the World Indoor championships. He also won the overall IAAF Golden League jackpot in 2004 where he cashed in 500,000 US dollars (after splitting the million dollar pot with Tonique Williams-Darling).

From 2007 to his retirement in 2012, he was beset by injuries which left him largely on the sidelines and unable to compete at top level competitions.

Biography
Olsson was born in Gothenburg, and made his international breakthrough in 2001 when he won silver at the 2001 World Championships in Athletics. He has the Swedish national record outdoors, 17.79 m (2004 Summer Olympics), and the Swedish national record indoors, 17.83 m (2004). Olsson has won the Swedish Championships seven times, and has also competed successfully on national level in high jumping.

On 7 March 2004, at the 2004 World Indoor Championships in Athletics, he jumped 17.83 m and matched the World Record. On 23 August 2004, at the 2004 Summer Olympics, he jumped 17.79 m, broke the national record and won the gold medal as the first Swede since Gustaf Lindblom in 1912, 92 years earlier. Four of his six jumps were longer than the silver medalist's best jump.

With the Olympic Gold he completed a rare international sweep, having the Olympic, World Indoor, Outdoor, Regional (European) Indoor and Outdoor titles.

Olsson first became interested in triple jump after watching Jonathan Edwards set the world record at the World Championships in his hometown Gothenburg. Since 1999, Olsson has been trained by Yannick Tregaro. Before that, Olsson was trained by Viljo Nousiainen.

During the autumn and winter 2004/2005 he injured his foot (an injury originating from the 2004 Olympic Final), preventing him from being able to do triple-jumping at full speed. Unfortunately the injury healed very slowly, and it was still in January 2006 hampering him. In his first competition after the injury, in June 2006, he jumped 17.09 and seem to be back into shape.
A month later he won the gold medal at European Championships in his hometown Gothenburg, with a jump of 17.67 m.

At the beginning of the 2007 indoor season, Olsson was injured yet again, and was unable to compete at the European indoor championships.

Olsson returned to competition in June at the IAAF Golden League event in Oslo, jumping 17.33 m. In July, he won Golden League event in Paris with 17.56 m. At the Golden League event in Rome, he retired after the second round due to a cramp.

Olsson went to the 2007 World Championships in Athletics but had to pull out before the competition due to an injury during training.

After almost one year of rehabilitation, he returned to competition in July 2008 at the annual event in Stockholm, "DN Galan", but had to pull out due to injury. Afterwards, he announced that he would not compete anymore during the 2008 season; hence he would not participate in the Beijing Olympics. He also suggested that he might retire from the sport. Upon a request from the Swedish Olympic team, Olsson agreed to carry the Swedish flag during the opening ceremony.

In July 2009, Olsson made a comeback in a minor event arranged by Örgryte IS in Gothenburg. He then jumped 17.24 m.

On 3 August 2009 Olsson competed in Swedish Championships in Malmö. He won the competition with a jump at 16.72 m. This was the first competition Olsson failed to reach 17 m or more since he jumped in a competition in Birmingham in 2003.

On 14 May 2012, Olsson ultimately declared his intentions to retire from professional triple jump competitions.

Christian Olsson lives with his family in Lindome, south of Göteborg.

Competition record

Other victories

Triple jump
2001: Helsinki (Grand Prix) - 17.08 m; Vaasa (European Cup first league) - 17.00 m; Rethymno (athletics meet) - 17.49 m
2002: Athens (Grand Prix) - 17.40 m; Seville (European Cup first league) - 17.63 m; Monaco (IAAF Golden League) - 17.63 m; Berlin (Golden League) - 17.40 m; Paris (Grand Prix Final) - 17.48 m
2003: Lappeenranta (European Cup first league) - 17.38 m; Rethymno (athletics meet) - 17.55 m; Gateshead (Grand Prix) - 17.92(w) m; Stockholm (Grand Prix) - 17.36 m; Monaco (World Athletics Final) - 17.55 m
2004: Turin (Grand Prix) - 17.61 m; Bergen (Golden League) - 17.58 m; Bydgoszcz (European Cup super league) - 17.30 m; Gateshead (Grand Prix) - 17.43 m; Rome (Golden League) - 17.50 m; Paris Saint-Denis (Golden League) - 17.41 m; Zürich (Golden League) - 17.46 m; Brussels (Golden League) - 17.44 m; Berlin (Golden League) - 17.45 m; Monaco (World Athletics Final) - 17.66 m
2006: Prague (European Cup super league) - 17.40 m; Lausanne (Grand Prix) - 17.62 m; London (Grand Prix) - 17.42 m; Zürich (Golden League-meet) - 17.39 m
2007: Vaasa (European Cup first league) - 17.33 m; Paris Saint-Denis (Golden League) - 17.56 m; Rome (Golden League) - 17.19 m

International awards
Waterford Crystal European Athlete of the Year Trophy 2004
Waterford Crystal European Athlete of the Year Trophy 2003

Personal bests
Triple jump
Indoor - 17.83 metres
Outdoor - 17.79 metres
High jump - 2.28 metres
Long jump - 7.71 metres

References

External links

 
 
 
 
 BBC Sports Article - (2004 Summer Olympics)
 BBC Sports Article - (2003 World Championships in Athletics)

1980 births
Living people
Athletes from Gothenburg
Olympic athletes of Sweden
Athletes (track and field) at the 2000 Summer Olympics
Athletes (track and field) at the 2004 Summer Olympics
Olympic gold medalists for Sweden
Swedish male triple jumpers
Swedish male high jumpers
Swedish expatriates in Monaco
World Athletics Championships medalists
European Athletics Championships medalists
Medalists at the 2004 Summer Olympics
Örgryte IS Friidrott athletes
Olympic gold medalists in athletics (track and field)
Goodwill Games medalists in athletics
IAAF Golden League winners
European Athlete of the Year winners
World Athletics Indoor Championships winners
World Athletics Championships winners
Competitors at the 2001 Goodwill Games